New Brunswick has had, since the Legislative Council was abolished by an act passed on 16 April 1891,
a unicameral legislature called the Legislative Assembly of New Brunswick with 49 seats. The legislature functions according to the Westminster system of government. Elections are now held at least every five years but may be called at any time by the lieutenant governor (the vice-regal representative) on consultation with the premier.

There are two dominant political parties in New Brunswick, the Liberal Party and the Progressive Conservative Party. While consistently polling approximately 10% of the electoral vote since the early 1980s, the New Democratic Party has elected few members to the Legislative Assembly. From time to time, other parties such as the Confederation of Regions Party and more recently Green Party of New Brunswick and People's Alliance of New Brunswick have held seats in the legislature.

Institutions 

 Legislative Assembly of New Brunswick

Political parties 
The two major political parties in New Brunswick are the New Brunswick Liberal Association and the Progressive Conservative Party of New Brunswick. 

The United Farmers earned 6 seats during the 1920 election. The Confederation of Regions Party is the only minor party to have been official opposition at the legislative assembly. It won 8 seats in the 1991 elections and 3 seats in 1995.

The registered political parties during the 2020 elections were: 

 New Brunswick Liberal Association
 Progressive Conservative Party of New Brunswick
 New Brunswick New Democratic Party
 Green Party of New Brunswick
 People's Alliance of New Brunswick
 KISS NB

Electoral system 
During the 1861 provincial elections, New Brunswick was the first in North America to use the secret ballot.

In 1785, women were banned from voting by the Legislative Council of New Brunswick.  Women got the right to vote in provincial elections in 1919 and were allowed to be candidates in 1934. Brenda Robertson was the first woman elected to the legislative assembly during the 1967 provincial election.

The Elections Act of 1952 prevented First Nations members to vote in provincial elections. This measure was revoked 11 years later.

Provincial elections occur every four years on the third Monday in October. New Brunswick first passed legislation to set a fixed election date in 2007.

Elections

1867-1930
From 1867 to 1878, party labels were not in use for general elections. While party identification began to be employed in the 1882 general election, parties did not become formally organized until the 1917 election, and were not legally recognized until 1935.

The financial condition of the county municipalities of the province was deemed excellent in 1915.  The ordinary revenue for the province in 1915 amounted to $1,634,079 and the ordinary expenditure to $1,626,634.  Findings were that ten counties out of fifteen (not including the city and county of Saint John) had an assessable valuation of real and personal property of over thirty million dollars, with insignificant liabilities.  The city of Saint John was in 1915 the commercial capital of the province, with a population of about 58,000, out of more than 350,000, in other words more than 16% of the total. Its valuation for assessment purposes in 1915 was $36,187,000 and its liabilities were less than $5,000,000. The city of Fredericton, the capital of the province, with a population in 1915 of 8,000, had a valuation of real and personal property for assessment of $5,000,000 with an outstanding indebtedness of $486,000.

1935-1982
Between 1935 and 1974, some ridings were multi member seats – i.e., more than one Member of the Legislative Assembly was elected from certain ridings. Since 1974, each riding (electoral district) has elected only one member to the Legislative Assembly of New Brunswick.

1987-present
During the 1987 election, Frank McKenna's liberal party won all 58 seats.

Since 2000, the province has had four leaders, Bernard Lord, who was elected twice, Shawn Graham, David Alward and Brian Gallant.  Lord was defeated based in part on the perceived mismanagement of the NB Power thermal generating stations.

On September 19, 2006, the Liberals won a majority with 29 out of 55 seats, making 38-year-old Shawn Graham the new Premier of New Brunswick on a platform called the Charter for Change, which pledged to focus on "the three Es": energy, education and the economy.

In the 2010 general election, the Progressive Conservatives won 42 out of 55 seats, making David Alward the 32nd Premier of New Brunswick. The controversy this time was over the planned sale of NB Power to Hydro-Quebec.

On 24 September 2014 Brian Gallant was elected with 27 seats out of 49. An important election issue was hydraulic fracturing, which was supported by the government, while the Liberal opposition promised to implement a moratorium on the practice. As Green Party of New Brunswick elected with their first seat for their leader David Coon in newly created Fredericton South district.

On 24 September 2018, the Progressive Conservatives won 22 out of 49 seats, while the Liberal party received the plurality of votes cast. The Liberals won 21 seats. The Green Party of New Brunswick and the People's Alliance of New Brunswick each won 3 seats.

On 14 September 2020, the Progressive Conservatives won 27 out of 49 seats, thus getting a small PC majority, while the Liberal party decreasing both voters and losing 4 seats. The Green Party of New Brunswick retains its 3 seats, but gaining more voters. While, the People's Alliance of New Brunswick has loss more voters than the Liberals, and lose one seat.

Political culture and issues 

The dynamics of New Brunswick politics differ from those of other provinces in Canada. The lack of a dominant urban centre in the province means that the government has to be responsive to issues affecting all areas of the province. In addition, the presence of a large francophone minority dictates that consensus politics is necessary, even when there is a majority government present. In this manner, the ebb and flow of New Brunswick provincial politics parallels the federal stage.  The Premier suggests recipients of preferment within his remit to the Lieutenant Governor, who has not publicly disapproved them in recent memory. This preferment at times surfaces in the legal arena. Although the appointment process is normally "at Her Majesty's pleasure" it was reported on 8 June 2016 that Rino Volpé had brought an action against the government valued at $1.3 million because of his early termination as CEO of the Vitalité Health Network. The intrusion of the preferment process into the Judicature Act drew sharp criticism in early 2016 from the chief justice of the Court of Queen's Bench, whose power to place judges where he deems fit will thus be curtailed in favour of the Minister of Justice. It was rumoured that this issue was at the centre of the ministerial reshuffle of 2016, which saw Stephen Horsman replaced by Denis Landry in the Justice portfolio.

Since 1960, the province has elected young bilingual leaders. This combination of attributes permits the premiers of New Brunswick to be influential players on the federal stage. Former Premier Bernard Lord (Progressive Conservative) has been touted as a potential leader of the Conservative Party of Canada. Frank McKenna (premier, 1987–1997), had been considered to be a front-runner to succeed Prime Minister Paul Martin. Richard Hatfield (premier, 1970–1987) played an active role in the patriation of the Canadian constitution and creation of the Canadian Charter of Rights and Freedoms. Louis Robichaud (premier, 1960–1970) was responsible for a wide range of social reforms.

A September 2010 report released by the Canadian Taxpayers Federation criticized the pensions made by members of the legislative assembly, which take 16 taxpayer dollars for every dollar contributed by the Member of the Legislative Assembly (MLA) and cost taxpayers $7.6 million annually.  According to the organization, New Brunswick legislators have one of the richest pension plans in the country, after voting for an 85 percent increase in 2008.

See also

 List of New Brunswick Premiers
 Politics of Canada
 Political culture of Canada
 Council of the Federation

References

Further reading

External links
Official site of the Government of New Brunswick